Mount Arrowsmith in Antarctica  is a jagged rock peak near Mount Perseverance, 2 miles (3.2 km) along a ridge running northeast from that mountain, and a like distance east of Mount Whitcombe in Victoria Land. Mapped in 1957 by the New Zealand Northern Survey Party of the Commonwealth Trans-Antarctic Expedition (1956–58), it was named by them for its similarity to the Canterbury, New Zealand, mountain of that name, and in association with Mount Whitcombe.

Mountains of Victoria Land
Scott Coast